Kim Ye-rim (born March 5, 1999), known by her stage name Yeri, is a South Korean singer and actress. She is a member of South Korean girl group Red Velvet.

Early life
Kim Ye-rim was born on March 5, 1999, in Seoul, South Korea. She has three younger sisters: Yoo-rim, Ye-eun and Chae-eun. Yeri graduated from Hanlim Multi Art School in 2018.

Career

Pre-debut activities 
Yeri joined SM Entertainment after auditioning at the SM Weekly Audition in 2011. In 2014, she performed as one of the upcoming members of SM Entertainment's pre-debut training team SM Rookies on the SM Town Live World Tour IV. She made a brief appearance in the introduction of Red Velvet's debut song, "Happiness", before debuting as a member in 2015.

2015–present: Red Velvet and solo activities

Yeri was introduced as a new member of Red Velvet on March 10, 2015, during the promotions of their first extended play (EP) Ice Cream Cake. From May 9 to November 14, Yeri hosted MBC's music program Show! Music Core together with Minho from Shinee and N from VIXX.

In July 2016, Yeri played the female lead in the music video for J-Min and Shim Eun-jee's single "Way Back Home", which was released as part of the project SM Station. In 2016, Yeri became an MC for the SM C&C web-variety program The Viewable SM together with Leeteuk.

In December 2017, singer Ragoon released his EP Talking, whose lead single "Story" was co-written by Yeri.

In April 2018, Yeri was confirmed as part of the cast of JTBC's new variety show Secret Unnie together with Han Chae-young. On December 13, Yeri, together with NCT's Renjun, Jeno and Jaemin, took part in the third season SM Station. They released the official Korean soundtrack version of "Hair in the Air" from the television series Trolls: The Beat Goes On!.

On March 14, 2019, the music video for Yeri's first self-composed solo project "Dear Diary" was released as a part of SM Station Season 3. The same month, Yeri was confirmed as part of the cast of Law of the Jungle in Thailand   In May, she featured in South Korean rapper Giant Pink's song "Tuesday is better than Monday".

On June 8, 2020, the first episode of Yeri's reality-variety show Yeri's Room aired on the YouTube channel Dum Dum Studio. New episodes premiered every Monday and Wednesday, with special clips uploaded every Friday. The guest in the first episode was Twice member Nayeon. On July 24, Yeri participated in the NCSOFT Fever 2020 Cool Summer Project and released a remake of "Woman On The Beach" by Cool as a collaboration with AB6IX Jeon Woong and Ravi. On August 7, the third song remake in the project, "Sorrow", was released. Yeri appeared in the music video along with Ravi and Kim Woo-seok.

In February 2021, Yeri was cast in tvN's one-act drama Drama Stage in the episode "Mint Condition". On April 7, Yeri was cast as female lead of the web series Blue Birthday.

Other ventures

Endorsement
Aside from endorsements with Red Velvet, in January 2020, Yeri released her own lipstick collection with make-up brand Notre Colette. In July 2020, AprilSkin Korea announced Yeri as their new exclusive brand model, noting that they selected Yeri for her "sensuous and trendy image" that matched well with their brand concept.

Philanthropy
In February 2020, Yeri donated 10 million won to the Community Chest of Korea to help support those affected by the COVID-19 pandemic in South Korea. On March 5, 2021, Yeri donated 10 million won to Jusarang Community's Baby Box to help single-mother families and "baby box" infants.

Discography

Singles

Composition credits

Filmography

Film

Television series

Web series

Television shows

Web shows

Notes

References

External links

  

1999 births
Living people
Singers from Seoul
Red Velvet (group) members
SM Rookies members
South Korean female idols
South Korean women pop singers
South Korean child singers
South Korean television personalities
South Korean dance musicians
South Korean web series actresses
21st-century South Korean women singers
Hanlim Multi Art School alumni